Elizaveta Rutkovskaja (born 9 December 1997) is an Estonian footballer who plays as a midfielder and has appeared for the Estonia women's national team.

Rutkovskaja has been capped for the Estonia national team, appearing for the team during the 2019 FIFA Women's World Cup qualifying cycle.

References

External links
 
 
 
 
 

1997 births
Living people
Estonian women's footballers
Estonia women's international footballers
Women's association football midfielders
Estonian people of Russian descent